Tasker is an Android application originally developed by a developer known as "Pent", and later purchased by João Dias. It enables performing user-defined actions based on contexts (application, time, date, location, event, gesture) in user-defined profiles, activated by click- or timer-based home screen widgets. It is expandable via plugins from the developer and third-party apps. The app is available from Google Play; a 7-day free trial version which does not allow restoring backups can be downloaded as an APK on the app's website.

Management
Tasker works manually as well as automatically. It monitors the phone for contexts and performs tasks based on them. A profile stands as combination of a context and a task.

Actions 
Actions are basic functions that modify the device's settings or process data from a source such as a file on the user's phone or an HTTP request. Each task is composed of sequential actions. Some Actions may require root access or ADB. Common actions:
 Toggle each phone setting (such as Wi-Fi, Bluetooth, Auto-brightness, etc.) on or off
Launch or "kill" a specific app
Set the audio volume to a specified value
Lock an application with a PIN code
Read, write, copy, move, and delete a file on the user's device
Basic image editing tools (such as cropping, filtering, and rotating)
Basic media controls
Get the GPS location of the phone
Call a number specified
Create, read and modify Tasker variables
Run JavaScript code
Integration with Google Drive
Text-to-speech
Tasker also supports third-party actions from apps such as SleepBot.

Development 
Tasker was inspired by Apt, a macro application developed by GlassWave in 2007 for devices running Palm OS. Tasker was first developed in 2009 for the Android Developer Challenge 2, where the app came 3rd in the Productivity/Tools category. The app was released to the public in June 2010.

In November 2015, Tasker was removed from the Google Play Store for violating the Developer Programme Policy regarding Dangerous Products for system interference. The issue appeared related to Doze and App Standby features, which were offered instead of a blanket permission to ignore battery optimizations. Google allows chat/voice apps to use the permission in Android to ignore the new battery optimization, features introduced with Doze Mode in Android 6.0 Marshmallow. The app was back in the Google Play Store as a "paid app" in 2016.

In March 2018, Tasker was purchased by João Dias.

App Factory
The Tasker App Factory allows Tasker projects to be exported as standalone apps. To add a UI, you can use a Show Scene action in Tasker. The resulting app can be distributed and installed on devices that do not have Tasker installed. However, any required plugins must be installed on the destination device. It does not support files. App Factory is offered at no additional charge at the store. Further, apps produced by the App Factory can be licensed on the Play Store.

AutoApps 
AutoApps is a separate application for Android that contains a suite of developer plugins. Each plugin adds conditions and/or actions to Tasker. In the app, the user can purchase separate plugins via the Google Play Store or subscribe for access to all plugins. Each plugin has a lite version that is free to use but restricts functionality (e.g. the lite version of AutoLaunch allows interaction with up to 20 apps). Some plugins also request the user to watch an advertisement to use for 24 hours.

Alpha Apps 
Alpha Apps are developer plugins that can only be unlocked via an AutoApps subscription. Below are a list of plugins that rely on the subscription.

TaskerNet 
As of Tasker v5.5 Tasks/Profiles/Projects can be sent into TaskerNet and shared. This system is hosted on Tasker servers. It is basically a cloud storage system for Tasker files.

TaskerNet entries support HTML descriptions for those looking to Import it.

Issues 
Crypt actions are not available in the Google Play version of Tasker due to US restrictions. Android 10 requires ADB for setting the clipboard and the new Wi-Fi permission for toggling Wi-Fi.

References

External links
 Tasker on Google Play 

Computer-related introductions in 2010
Android (operating system) software